Keep Breathing is an American survival drama limited series created by Martin Gero and Brendan Gall for Netflix. The series consisted of six episodes, and premiered on July 28, 2022.

Premise 
When a small plane crashes in the middle of the Canadian wilderness, a lone woman must battle the elements and odds to survive.

Cast and characters 
 Melissa Barrera as Liv, a sharp attorney who crashes in the middle of the Canadian wilderness
 Jeff Wilbusch as Danny, Liv's off-again, on-again love interest
 Florencia Lozano as Liv's mother
 Juan Pablo Espinosa as Liv's father
 Austin Stowell as Sam, a co-pilot who lets Liv fly with them
 Getenesh Berhe as Ruth, Liv's co-worker and friend, who initially sets her and Danny up on a date

Episodes

Production

Development 
In February 2021, Breathe was given a series order. The series is created, written, and executive produced by Martin Gero and Brendan Gall. Warner Bros. Television Studios produces the series. Maggie Kiley joined the series as executive producer and director of the first three episodes in June 2021. The series was retitled Keep Breathing in June 2022.

Casting 
In June 2021, Melissa Barrera was set to star in the series. Jeff Wilbusch was added as a recurring guest star one month later. The same month, Florencia Lozano and Juan Pablo Espinosa joined as recurring. Austin Stowell joined the cast in September 2021.

Filming 
Filming began on June 28, 2021, in Vancouver, and wrapped on September 20, 2021.

Reception 

The review aggregator website Rotten Tomatoes reported a 56% approval rating with an average rating of 5.60/10, based on 18 critic reviews. The website's critical consensus reads, "Brisk pacing and Melissa Barrera's compelling presence help Keep Breathing stay alive, even as the series chokes whenever it tries to broaden its scope." Metacritic, which uses a weighted average, assigned a score of 45 out of 100 based on 7 critics, indicating "mixed or average reviews".

References

External links 
 

2020s American drama television miniseries
2022 American television series debuts
2022 American television series endings
English-language Netflix original programming
Television shows about aviation accidents or incidents
Television shows filmed in Vancouver
Television series by Warner Bros. Television Studios